Clinton O'Brien (born 10 January 1974) is an Australian former professional rugby league footballer who played in the 1990s and 2000s. A Queensland State of Origin representative forward, he played club football in Australia for the Sydney Roosters, South Queensland Crushers, Gold Coast Chargers and Newcastle Knights (with whom he won the 2001 NRL premiership), as well as English club Wakefield Trinity Wildcats.  O'Brein represented Queensland in the 1997 State of Origin series.

Playing career
O'Brien made his first grade debut for Eastern Suburbs against St George in Round 12 1993.

In 1996, O'Brien joined South Queensland and in 1997 played in the club's final ever game, a 39-18 victory over Western Suburbs.  In 1998, O'Brien joined the Gold Coast and played in the club's final ever game which was a 20-18 defeat against Cronulla.

In 1999, O'Brien joined Newcastle.  He played for the Newcastle Knights from the interchange bench in their 2001 NRL Grand Final victory over the Parramatta Eels. Having won the 2001 NRL Premiership, Newcastle traveled to England to play the 2002 World Club Challenge against Super League champions, the Bradford Bulls. O'Brien played at from the interchange bench in Newcastle's loss.

References

1974 births
Australian rugby league players
Rugby league players from Queensland
Sydney Roosters players
South Queensland Crushers players
Newcastle Knights players
Wakefield Trinity players
Queensland Rugby League State of Origin players
Rugby league props
Living people
Gold Coast Chargers players